Acrodactyla is a genus of insect belonging to the family Ichneumonidae.

The genus was first described by Haliday in 1839.

The genus has cosmopolitan distribution.

Species:
 Acrodactyla aequaria Momoi, 1966
 Acrodactyla quadrisculpta (Gravenhorst, 1820)

References

Ichneumonidae
Ichneumonidae genera